The Golden Pavement is a 1915 British silent drama film directed by Cecil M. Hepworth and starring Alma Taylor, Stewart Rome and Lionelle Howard.

Cast
 Alma Taylor as Brenda Crayle  
 Stewart Rome as Dennis  
 Lionelle Howard as Martin Lestrange  
 William Felton as The crook 
 Henry Vibart as The nobleman

References

Bibliography
 Palmer, Scott. British Film Actors' Credits, 1895-1987. McFarland, 1988.

External links

1915 films
1915 drama films
British drama films
British silent feature films
Films directed by Cecil Hepworth
Films set in Devon
Hepworth Pictures films
British black-and-white films
1910s English-language films
1910s British films
Silent drama films